Mount Olivet Cemetery is a cemetery in Middletown, New Jersey.

Notable interments
 Vince Lombardi (1913–1970), National Football League coach
 Snuffy Stirnweiss (1918–1958), Major League Baseball player

References

External links
 
 

Cemeteries in Monmouth County, New Jersey
Middletown Township, New Jersey